Barbara Gray may refer to:
 Barbara Gray (police officer), officer with the Police Service of Northern Ireland
 Barbara Gray (urban planner)
 Barbara Gray (politician), member of the Massachusetts House of Representatives
 Barbara Gray, lead character of the British TV series Nanny